Suning County is a county in the central part of Hebei province, China.

Administrative divisions
There are 5 towns and 4 townships under the county's administration.

Towns:
Suning, Liangjiacun, Wobei, Shangcun, Wanli

Townships:
Shisuo Township, Hebeiliushansi Township, Fujiazuo Township, Shaozhuang Township

Climate

References

External links

County-level divisions of Hebei
Cangzhou